Salt Creek is a stream located entirely within Muskingum County, Ohio.

Salt Creek was so named for the salt production there by pioneer settlers.

It is spanned by the Salt Creek Covered Bridge.

See also
List of rivers of Ohio
Muskingum Salt Reservations

References

Rivers of Muskingum County, Ohio
Rivers of Ohio